Waterford Kamhlaba United World College of Southern Africa (WKUWCSA), one of 18 international schools and colleges in the UWC educational movement, is located outside of Mbabane, Eswatini.

Waterford was the first school in southern Africa open to children and youth of all colours. It was started in direct opposition to the apartheid regime in neighboring South Africa. Nelson Mandela, Desmond Tutu, and many others leaders in the struggle against apartheid, sent their children to school there. 

Waterford Kamhlaba was established by Michael Stern in 1963. The school's mission was similar to the philosophy of the UWC movement, and Waterford became the fourth member school of the UWC movement in 1981. Anthony (Tony) Hatton, for many years an English teacher at Waterford Kamhlaba, wrote an account of the early years of the school.

Notable alumni

 Maria Alejandra Molina, Actress and news anchor
 John MacMillan, actor
 Daliso Chaponda, comedian
 Stian Jenssen, Director of the Private Office of NATOs Secretary General, Jens Stoltenberg
 Ian Khama, former President of Botswana
 Robin Chase, American entrepreneur
 Kemiyondo Coutinho, Ugandan playwright, actress and filmmaker
 Jonathan Crush, scientist
 Keith Fraser, 1992 Olympic athlete
 Paul Friedlander, Swazi golfer
 Richard E. Grant, actor
 Solomon Guramatunhu, ophthalmologist
 Fernando Honwana, special advisor to Samora Machel killed with Machel in 1986 plane crash
 Aaron Kopp, documentary maker
 Anna Livia, author
 Alan McGregor (academic) former Dean of Medicine, King's College, UK
 Makaziwe Mandela, daughter of Nelson Mandela
 Mandla Mandela, South African tribal chief
 Zenani Mandela, daughter of Nelson Mandela
 Zindzi Mandela, daughter of Nelson Mandela
 Nnenna Okore, Nigerian-Australian artist Mandela
 Ignacio Padilla, Mexican author
 Matthew Parris, politician/writer/journalist, London, UK
 Lindiwe Sisulu, former Minister of Defence and Minister of Housing, South Africa
 Xochitl Torres Small, U.S. representative from New Mexico's 2nd congressional district
 Thomas Ward, mathematician
 Alan Whiteside, academic and researcher

See also
Dick and Enid Eyeington
Michael Stern

References

External links
Waterford Kamhlaba School 	
United World Colleges 	

 	

Schools in Eswatini
International Baccalaureate schools in Eswatini
Educational institutions established in 1963
1963 establishments in Swaziland
Mbabane